San Martín Itunyoso is a Trique language town and municipality in Oaxaca in south-western Mexico. The municipality covers an area of 82.93 km². 
It is part of the Tlaxiaco District in the south of the Mixteca Region.

As of 2005, the municipality had a total population of 2554.

See also
 Trique people
 Trique language
 San Juan Copala
 Santo Domingo del Estado

References

Municipalities of Oaxaca